Monetta is a town in Aiken and Saluda counties, South Carolina, United States. The population was 236 at the 2010 census.

The Aiken County portion of Monetta is part of the Augusta, Georgia metropolitan area.
The Saluda County portion of Monetta is part of the Columbia, SC Metropolitan Area.

Geography
Monetta is located at  (33.849642, -81.608200), near the southern corner of Saluda County and the northern corner of Aiken County. U.S. Route 1 passes through the town, leading northeast to Batesburg-Leesville and then Columbia, the state capital, and southwest to Aiken.

Demographics

As of the census of 2000, there were 220 people, 92 households, and 64 families living in the town. The racial makeup of the town was 73.64% White, 24.55% African American, and 1.82% from two or more races. Hispanic or Latino of any race were 5.00% of the population.

There were 92 households, out of which 34.8% had children under the age of 18 living with them, 51.1% were married couples living together, 15.2% had a female householder with no husband present, and 30.4% were non-families. 28.3% of all households were made up of individuals, and 15.2% had someone living alone who was 65 years of age or older. The average household size was 2.39 and the average family size was 2.92.

In the town, the population was spread out, with 24.5% under the age of 18, 6.8% from 18 to 24, 27.3% from 25 to 44, 26.8% from 45 to 64, and 14.5% who were 65 years of age or older. The median age was 40 years. For every 100 females, there were 76.0 males. For every 100 females age 18 and over, there were 78.5 males.

The median income for a household in the town was $28,750, and the median income for a family was $39,167. Males had a median income of $30,000 versus $21,875 for females. The per capita income for the town was $16,867. About 8.1% of families and 6.5% of the population were below the poverty line, including none of those under the age of eighteen and 10.3% of those 65 or over.

2010 Demographics
The following is from the 2010 Demographics
Total Population 236 (100.00%)
 
Population by Race
Black or African American alone	44 (18.64%)
Some other race alone 9	(3.81%)
Two or more races 10 (4.24%)
White alone 173 (73.31%)
 
Population by Hispanic or Latino Origin (of any race)
Persons Not of Hispanic or Latino Origin 204 (86.44%)
Persons of Hispanic or Latino Origin 32 (13.56%)
 
Population by Gender
Female 129 (54.66%)
Male   107 (45.34%)
 
Population by Age
Persons 0 to 4 years 8 (3.39%)
Persons 5 to 17 years 43 (18.22%)
Persons 18 to 64 years	147 (62.29%)
Persons 65 years and over 38 (16.10%)

References

 

Towns in South Carolina
Towns in Aiken County, South Carolina
Towns in Saluda County, South Carolina
Columbia metropolitan area (South Carolina) 
Augusta metropolitan area